The 2000 Boise State Broncos football team represented Boise State University in the 2000 NCAA Division I-A football season. The Broncos competed in the Big West Conference and played their home games at Bronco Stadium in Boise, Idaho. The Broncos were led by third-year head coach Dirk Koetter.

The Broncos finished the season 10–2 and 5–0 in conference to win their second consecutive Big West title. 2000 was the Broncos' final year in the Big West (a conference that ceased to sponsor football after this season) as they joined the Western Athletic Conference in 2001.

At the end of the regular season, head coach Dirk Koetter resigned to take the same position at Arizona State but did stay on to coach in the Broncos' bowl game. The Broncos hired offensive coordinator Dan Hawkins as their new head coach.

Schedule

References

Boise State
Boise State Broncos football seasons
Big West Conference football champion seasons
Famous Idaho Potato Bowl champion seasons
Boise State Broncos football